The Adventure of the Wrong Santa Claus is a 1914 silent Christmas film.

Storyline 
A burglar in a Santa suit steals a family's Christmas presents. Amateur detective Octavius decides to catch him and recover the stolen things.

Cast 
Barry O'Moore - Octavius, the Amateur Detective
 Julian Reed - Ignatz - the Butler
 Richard Neill	- Mr. Randall
 Bliss Milford - Mrs. Bertha Randall
 Kenneth Lawlor - Dick
 Kathleen Coughlin - Mamie	 	 	
 Edith Peters - Kate		 	
 John Sturgeon	- The Wrong Santa Claus (burglar)

See also
 List of Christmas films

Sources 
 The Adventure of the Wrong Santa Claus (1914) on Internet Movie Database

American silent short films
American black-and-white films
1914 films
Santa Claus in film
1910s Christmas films
American Christmas comedy-drama films
Articles containing video clips
1914 comedy-drama films
1910s American films
Comedy-drama short films
Silent American comedy-drama films